The Großer Wannsee ("Greater Wannsee", "See" means lake) is a bight of the Havel river near the locality of Wannsee and Nikolassee (in the borough of Steglitz-Zehlendorf), a south-western suburb of the German capital Berlin not far from Potsdam. Between the river itself and the Wannsee lies the Breite, or Grosse Breite (Broad, or Great Broad). To the north lies the  island of Schwanenwerder and, opposite from the Greater Wannsee on the other side of the Havel, is the locality of Kladow (in Spandau).

Overview
The Wannsee lake is well known as the number-one bathing and recreation spot for western Berlin, especially from a 1951 Schlager hit by teen idol Cornelia Froboess. The Strandbad Wannsee, an open-air lido with one of the longest inland beaches in Europe and a popular nudist area, was built in 1920–30 after a concept by architect Richard Ermisch. Situated on the eastern shore of the lake it is officially part of the Nikolassee locality.

Photogallery

See also
Kleiner Wannsee (Little Wannsee)
Pfaueninsel
Griebnitzsee
Wannsee Conference, which took place at a villa on the banks of the Grosse Wannsee

References

External links

Lakes of Berlin
Steglitz-Zehlendorf
River bays
Federal waterways in Germany
LGrosserWannsee